Huazhou Subdistrict is a subdistrict of Dengzhou, Henan, China.

Township-level divisions of Henan
Dengzhou